Jönssonligan får guldfeber (The Johnsson Gang gets Gold Fever - International: English title ) is a Swedish film about the gang Jönssonligan made in 1984.

The film includes a famous scene, where Jönssonligan's leader, Sickan Jönsson, is tied to the hands of a giant clock on the tower of the Stockholm City Hall. The clock doesn't exist in real life, but was created for the film. The reason for this is that the movie is a remake of the Danish film Olsen-bandens store kup, and the tower of Copenhagen City Hall does indeed have a clock.

Cast
Gösta Ekman – Charles-Ingvar "Sickan" Jönsson
Ulf Brunnberg – Ragnar Vanheden
Björn Gustafson – Harry "Dynamit-Harry" Kruth
Birgitta Andersson – Doris
Per Grundén – Director Wall-Enberg
Carl Billquist – Persson
Weiron Holmberg – Biffen
Sten Ljunggren – Fritz Müllweiser
Jan Waldekranz – Gren
Peter Harryson – Driver
Fredrik Ohlsson – Minister
Birger Malmsten – ÖB

External links 

Danish crime comedy films
Swedish crime comedy films
Jönssonligan films
1984 films
Films directed by Mikael Ekman
1980s Swedish films